Saint Paul's School, Rourkela is an Indian educational institution located in Rourkela, Odisha, that offers courses from the Kindergarten to the Senior-Secondary level.

History
The school was founded in 1964 by Rev. Fr. Thomas Morris, an Irish Catholic Priest and a member of SVD Society.

Early Years
Ever since its foundation, the school kept adding two classes (one each for upper and lower grades) every year. During its initial years, the school had faculties including Mr. T.S. Tripathy (Mathematics), Mr. Rajib Behera (Biology), Fr. Felix (Physics) and Mr. V.B. Nair (Physical Education).The first batch of Standard 10th appeared for the matriculation exam in the year 1969.

Co-education
Saint Paul's School was converted from an all-boys school to a co-education school in 2014. As of 2014, it was the only all-boys school in eastern India. A poll was conducted among the parents of students to decide whether or not to admit girls. The decision was taken by Fr S Joseph for the academic session 2013-14. The first girls were admitted from kindergarten.

Affiliation
The school is owned and operated by the Society of the Divine Word (SVD), a religious minority institution under article 30(1) of the Constitution of India. It is affiliated with the Council for the Indian School Certificate Examinations.

St. Paul's is a Catholic school that admits students of all religions. It exempts non-Catholic students from participating in religious practices particular to Catholics. The aim of St. Paul's is all-around development — academic, physical, moral and cultural — of its students into mature and responsible citizens who will be ready to take their rightful place in society.

Sports 
The school has a playground with a football ground, a cricket ground, two basketball courts, and five badminton courts. During the winter, many tournaments are organised. The badminton tournament is organized in December.

The school has four houses that compete with each other in sports tournaments.
Mountbatten—Red                                                                                                                      
Manekshaw—Yellow                                                                                                                     
Cariappa—Blue                                                                                                                       
Thimayya—Green

References

External links

Divine Word Missionaries Order
Catholic secondary schools in India
Primary schools in India
High schools and secondary schools in Odisha
Christian schools in Odisha
Schools in Rourkela
Educational institutions established in 1964
1964 establishments in Orissa